The Sacra di San Michele, sometimes known as Saint Michael's Abbey, is a religious complex on Mount Pirchiriano, situated on the south side of the Val di Susa in the territory of the municipality of Sant'Ambrogio di Torino, in the Metropolitan City of Turin, Piedmont region of northwestern Italy. The abbey, which for much of its history was under Benedictine rule, is now entrusted to the Rosminians.

A special regional law acknowledges it as the "Symbolic monument of the Piedmont region". 
This monumental abbey served as one of the inspirations for the book The Name of the Rose by Umberto Eco.

History

According to some historians, in Roman times a military stronghold existed on the current location of the abbey, commanding the main road leading to Gaul from Italy. Later, after the fall of the Western Roman Empire, the Lombards built a fortress here against the Frankish invasions.

Little is known of the early years of the abbey. The oldest extant account is that of a monk, William, who lived here in the late 11th century and wrote a Chronicon Coenobii Sancti Michaelis de Clusa. He sets the foundation of the abbey in 966, but, in another passage, the same monk maintains that the construction began under the pontificate of Sylvester II (999-1003).

What is certain is that what is now the crypt was built in the late 10th century, as attested by the Byzantine influence in the niches, columns and arches.  According to tradition, this building was constructed by the hermit Saint John Vincent at the behest of the archangel Michael to whom he was particularly devoted; and the building materials which the hermit had collected were transported miraculously to the top of the mountain. In addition, it is noted that the cult of St. Michael, the archangel who warred with Lucifer, typically bases its churches on pinnacles or hard to reach places, for example, Mont Saint-Michel in France.

In the following years a small edifice was added, which could house a small community of monks and some pilgrims.

Later the abbey developed under the Benedictine rule, with the construction of a separate building with guest-rooms for pilgrims following the popular Via Francigena and of a church-monastery (1015–1035), probably on the remains of the ancient Roman castrum. During Easter in 1098, St Anselm, archbishop of Canterbury, visited the monastery to see his nephew Anselm, who was a brother here. The younger Anselm would go on to serve as abbot of St Saba in Rome and Bury St Edmunds in England. Abbot Ermengardo (1099–1131) had a new large, 26 m-high basement built from the foot of the hill to its peak, on which a new church (the one still existing today) was added, including the surrounding structures.

In the year 1315, the manuscript Breviary of San Michele della Chiusa was written containing the prayer cycle of the year for the monks of the Abbey.

The monastery fell into decline and was finally suppressed in 1622 by Pope Gregory XV. It remained abandoned until 1835, when King Charles Albert and the Pope asked Antonio Rosmini to restore and repopulate it. It is currently under the care of the Rosminians.

Art and architecture

The church is located atop a rocky crag base and towers above the valley. The church façade leads to a staircase, the Scalone dei Morti ("Stairway of the Dead"), flanked by arches, niches and tombs in which, until recent times, skeletons of dead monks were visible (hence the name). At the top of the 243 steps is the marble Porta dello Zodiaco, a masterwork of 12th century sculpture. The church itself is accessed by a Romanesque portal in grey and green stone, built in the early 11th century. The church has a nave and two aisles, and features elements of both  Gothic and Romanesque architecture. On the left wall is a large fresco portraying the Annunciation (1505), while in the Old Choir is a triptych by Defendente Ferrari.

The complex includes the ruins of the 12th-15th centuries monastery, which had five floors. It ends with the Torre della Bell'Alda ("Tower of the Beautiful Alda") The so-called "Monks' Sepulchre" is probably the remains of a chapel reproducing, in its octagonal plan, the Holy Sepulchre of Jerusalem.

Notes

External links

Official website
Photos

Benedictine monasteries in Italy
Monasteries in Piedmont
Buildings and structures in the Metropolitan City of Turin
Christian monasteries established in the 10th century
1622 disestablishments
Gothic architecture in Piedmont
Romanesque architecture in Piedmont